Neuranethes is a small genus of herbivorous African moths in the family Noctuidae.
Species include:

 Neuranethes angola             Bethune-Baker 1911
 Neuranethes avitta             Fawcett 1917
 Neuranethes spodopterodes  Hampson 1908

References
Natural History Museum Lepidoptera genus database

References

Hadeninae